The Danish–Algerian War was a conflict lasting from 1769 to 1772 between Denmark–Norway and Deylik of Algiers which was a province of the Ottoman Empire, but it was mostly functionally independent. It is also known as the Algerian Expedition, or "The War Against Algeria".

Background and beginning of conflict
Danish-Norwegian trade in the Mediterranean greatly expanded in the mid 1700s. In order to protect their lucrative business against piracy, Denmark–Norway had secured a peace deal with the states of Barbary Coast, involving the payment an annual tribute to the individual rulers of those states and additionally to the States.

In 1766 Baba Mohammed ben-Osman became Dey of Algiers. He demanded that the annual payment made by Denmark–Norway should be increased, and he should receive new gifts. Denmark–Norway refused the demands. Shortly after, Algerian pirates hijacked three Danish-Norwegian ships and sold the crew into slavery.

Response

A punitive expedition comprising four ships of the line,  with two frigates and two bomb galiots, under the command of Frederik Christian Kaas, sailed from Copenhagen in 16 May 1770. They threatened to bombard the Algerian capital if the Algerians did not agree to a new peace deal on Danish terms. Algiers was not intimidated, and the Danish-Norwegian bombardment ended in failure, as a large part of the crew fell seriously ill due to an outbreak of typhoid. The ships could not withstand heavy mortar attacks from the Algerians, which damaged their hulls. The Danish-Norwegian contingent fired approximately 75 bombs at the city of Algiers before the attack had to be abandoned. The contingent then resorted to a blockade of the city.
The De Fire Søstre, a merchant and hospital ship was present with the Danish squadron in the Mediterranean 1770 -1771, and its captain, Jens Knudsen, visited the sick who had been landed at Port Mahon.

Aftermath
In 1772, a delegation was sent to Algiers, and after five days of negotiations a new peace was concluded in which Algiers was well-paid. In addition, Denmark–Norway had to pay for the return of each slave who had been captured during the war. Danish and Norwegian slaves who were sold to private slave owners had to individually negotiate the prices of their freedom.

Today the war is mostly forgotten in Denmark and Norway, because it played a small role in Danish and Norwegian history.

In Fiction
The 2013 novel 1001 natt by Vetle Lid Larssen follows two Norwegians enslaved during the war.

See also

 List of wars involving Denmark
 List of wars involving Norway
 List of conflicts in Algeria
 Action of 16 May 1797

References

Rxternal links
 Source

Wars involving Denmark
Wars involving Norway
Wars involving the Ottoman Empire
18th century in Algeria
Algeria–Denmark relations
Conflicts in 1769
Conflicts in 1770
Conflicts in 1771
Conflicts in 1772
Wars involving Algeria